New Holstein High School is a public high school located in New Holstein, Wisconsin, USA. It has an enrollment of approximately 336 students in 9th to 12th grades.

Enrollment 
From 2000 to 2019, enrollment declined by 24.4%.

Enrollment at New Holstein High School, 2000–2019

Sports 
New Holstein's mascot is the Husky. The school offers girls' and boys' soccer, mixed football, mixed track, mixed cross country, girls' volleyball, boys' and girls' basketball, girls' softball, mixed golf and boys' baseball. Two sports that most schools offer in the Eastern Wisconsin Conference that New Holstein does not are tennis and swimming.

New Holstein is the smallest school in the Eastern Wisconsin Conference. New Holstein's closest rivals are the Kiel Raiders.

State titles 
1941 and 1942 State Track and Field Champions 
1965 Baseball Champions
1982 Girls' Track and Field Champions
2010 Girls' Soccer Champions

References

External links
New Holstein School District

Public high schools in Wisconsin
Schools in Sheboygan County, Wisconsin